Edivaldo Medeiros da Silva, called Edivaldo (born March 23, 1974), is a Brazilian football player, currently playing in América-RJ. Edivaldo was born in Duque de Caxias, Rio de Janeiro.

Edivaldo is a striker and is the topscorer of his club on 2009 Campeonato Brasileiro Série B with 15 goals.

He previously played for América-RJ and Botafogo in the Copa do Brasil.

References

External links 
  ogol.com.br
  itumbiaraesportec.futblog.com.br
  www.souduque.com.br

Living people
1974 births
Brazilian footballers
Botafogo de Futebol e Regatas players
America Football Club (RJ) players
Botafogo Futebol Clube (PB) players
Duque de Caxias Futebol Clube players
Associação Desportiva Cabofriense players
Macaé Esporte Futebol Clube players
Madureira Esporte Clube players
People from Duque de Caxias, Rio de Janeiro
Association football forwards
Sportspeople from Rio de Janeiro (state)